Kaewkalaya Kamulthala (born August 7, 1994) is a Thai indoor volleyball player. She is a member of the Thailand women's national volleyball team.

Career
She participated at the 2015 U23 World Championship, 2016 World Grand Prix and 2019 Nations League.

In 2018 she played with the local JT Marvelous on loan.

Clubs
  Khonkaen Star (2012–2020)
  JT Marvelous (2018–2020)
  Diamond Food (2021–Present)

Awards

Clubs
 2012–13 Thailand League –  Champion, with Idea Khonkaen
 2013 Thai-Denmark Super League –  Champion, with Idea Khonkaen
 2019–20 Japan V.League –  Champion, with JT Marvelous

References

External links
 FIVB Biography
 u23 FIVB Biography

1994 births
Living people
Kaewkalaya Kamulthala
JT Marvelous players
Thai expatriate sportspeople in Japan
Expatriate volleyball players in Japan
Asian Games medalists in volleyball
Volleyball players at the 2014 Asian Games
Kaewkalaya Kamulthala
Kaewkalaya Kamulthala
Medalists at the 2014 Asian Games
Universiade medalists in volleyball
Universiade bronze medalists for Thailand
Medalists at the 2013 Summer Universiade
Kaewkalaya Kamulthala
Kaewkalaya Kamulthala